Venkatesh G. Ramaiah, MD, FACS is a vascular surgeon and researcher. His areas of work include innovations in the treatment of abdominal aortic aneurysms and peripheral arterial disease. Formerly a director of the Arizona Heart Hospital, he currently serves as Chief of Complex Vascular Services and Network Director of Vascular Services of the HonorHealth hospital system based in Scottsdale, Arizona. Dr. Ramaiah is also a co-founder of Pulse Cardiovascular Institute, an ambulatory surgical center in Scottsdale.

Biography 
Ramaiah was born in Tirupati and moved to Mumbai, India with his family as a child. He obtained his MBBS at Grant Medical College in Mumbai and completed his surgery residency at Temple University's Episcopal Campus in Philadelphia, Pennsylvania. He went on to complete a vascular surgery fellowship under renowned surgeon Dr. Edward "Ted" Diethrich at the Arizona Heart Hospital where he practiced for 20 years. He resides in Scottsdale with his wife, with whom he has two children.

Career 
Ramaiah has co-authored over 90 scholarly papers and continues to work in the research and development of new minimally-invasive vascular surgery technologies. His notable work includes a patent for the non-occlusive dilation devices used in endovascular procedures. He serves as principal investigator for several studies involving endovascular devices and technologies. In February 2020, Ramaiah performed the first skin-puncture bypass in Arizona on a patient with a complete occlusion of the femoral artery as part of the DETOUR II clinical trial.

Ramaiah is a co-author of Endovascular and Hybrid Management of the Thoracic Aorta: A Case-based Approach, a textbook on the surgical management of aortic pathologies.

References 

Indian surgeons
Indian medical academics
Living people
Year of birth missing (living people)
Temple University faculty